The Greenport Basin and Construction Company, known by various names throughout its history, but most recently named the Greenport Yacht & Shipbuilding Company, is a shipbuilder in Greenport, Suffolk County, New York. It was established in the 19th century by brothers Pliny C. Brigham and Theodore W. Brigham. One local history relates:

The company built dozens of ships for the United States Navy during World War I and World War II, as well as building yachts for private customers. In 1917 the company became involved in a tax case against the United States, in which it protested the assessment of an "excess profits" tax. The case made its way to the U.S. Supreme Court, where the company finally lost the decision in 1923. In 1970, the company was acquired by Stephen Clarke, and thereafter turned its attention from ship construction to ship maintenance and repairs, and historic preservation of ships.

Ships built or converted
Notable ships built by the company include:

In addition, the USS Patriot (PYc-47), built in 1930 by the Herreshoff Manufacturing Company in Bristol, Rhode Island, was converted for Navy service as a submarine chaser by Greenport Basin and Construction Company, in 1940.

References

Shipbuilding companies of New York (state)
Companies based in Suffolk County, New York
19th-century establishments in New York (state)